"Don't Check on Me" is a song by American singer Chris Brown, featuring vocals from Canadian singer Justin Bieber and American singer Ink. It was released as a promotional single from Brown's ninth studio album, Indigo, on June 25, 2019.

Background and composition
The song features an acoustic guitar riff, similar to past songs such as Brown's "With You" and Bieber's "Love Yourself". It is the first collaboration between the two artists since 2011's "Next to You". The song's lyrical content concerns moving on from a past relationship, with both Brown, Bieber, and Ink advising their former lovers to stop checking in on them and that the relationship ended for a reason.

Charts

Certifications

References

2019 singles
Chris Brown songs
Justin Bieber songs
Pop ballads
Songs written by Poo Bear
Songs written by Chris Brown
Songs written by Justin Bieber
2019 songs